Akasha Lawrence-Spence is an American politician and a Democratic member of the Oregon State Senate. She previously represented the 36th district in the Oregon House of Representatives; appointed on January 17, 2020, to replace Jennifer Williamson who resigned to run for Secretary of State. Lawrence-Spence was appointed by the Multnomah County Commission who by law appoints members of the same party to replace resigning legislators. She did not run for re-election. She has previously served as a member of the Portland Planning and Sustainability Commission.

In November 2021, Lawrence-Spence was appointed to the Oregon Senate to fill the vacancy caused by Ginny Burdick's resignation.

References 

Year of birth missing (living people)
Living people
21st-century American politicians
African-American state legislators in Oregon
Democratic Party members of the Oregon House of Representatives
Democratic Party Oregon state senators
Women state legislators in Oregon
Politicians from Portland, Oregon
21st-century American women politicians
21st-century African-American women
21st-century African-American politicians
African-American history of Oregon